Gabriel "Gabri" Martínez Aguilera (born 22 January 2003) is a Spanish footballer who plays as a forward for CD San Fernando, on loan from Girona FC.

Club career
Born in Sant Fost de Campsentelles, Barcelona, Catalonia, Martínez joined FC Barcelona's La Masia in 2012, from CF Martorelles. After leaving Barça in 2016, he played for two years for CF Damm before finishing his formation with Girona FC.

Martínez made his senior debut with the reserves on 10 January 2021, playing the last 19 minutes of a 0–0 Tercera División home draw against Cerdanyola del Vallès FC. He made his first team debut on 22 August, coming on as a second-half substitute for fellow youth graduate Gerard Gumbau in a 0–0 home draw against UD Las Palmas in the Segunda División championship.

On 13 July 2022, Martínez was loaned to Primera División RFEF side CD San Fernando for the season.

References

External links

2003 births
Living people
People from Vallès Oriental
Sportspeople from the Province of Barcelona
Spanish footballers
Footballers from Catalonia
Association football forwards
Segunda División players
Tercera División players
Tercera Federación players
Girona FC B players
Girona FC players
CD San Fernando players
Spain youth international footballers